The Temnikov Principality or Tümen Principality, also known as Murunza or the Bekhanid Principality of Tümen was a Mazhar and Moksha principality in Eastern Mishar Yurt (Temnikovsky and Kadomsky Uyezds). The state was closely allied with the Grand Duchy of Moscow.

Etymology
 and  means tümen commander and refers to the city founder Prince Tenish Kugushev or his immediate ancestors.
Other scholars M. Safargaliev, P. Chermensky consider Temnikov second one in importance ulus centre after Mukhsha since the etymology of the placename itself points at Golden Horde tümen commander's headquarters.

History
The principality was established by Prince Bekhan in 1388.
Temnikov, Kadom, Sacony and Andreev townlet had been destroyed during the period of Muscovy and Ryazan Principality raids in first decades of 15th century and later rebuilt in new cites. It was confirmed by archeological findings in 1960s.

Genetics
Members at FamilyTreeDNA tracing royal descent to Prince Bekhan of the Temnikov Principality, are grouped as (07 Tatar Princes - Bekhanids) in the Russian Nobility DNA project. All members belong to Y-haplogroup J2b-L283 > Y12000.

Tümen Princes
Kugushevs - Mishar dynasty
Rasts - Moksha dynasty (sometimes mistakenly referred to as "Siberian" since Tümen and Tyumen were mixed Djagfar Tarikhy mentioned Rasts as Seber Princes, which means "of Moksha or Hungarian descent"
Mentioned in Russian sources as Mordvin Princes

Administration
The Principality was divided into belyaks.

Population
The land was inhabited mainly by Mokshas, Mishars and Erzyas. Some Burtases resettled to Northern Mokshaland, and would be mentioned in later Russian documents as Posop Tatars since they served as prince's army bread suppliers and paid bread tax.

See also
Qasim Khanate
Mukhsha Ulus
Mordvin Princes
Golden Horde

References

Sources

External links

Golden Horde
Mongol rump states
Tatar states
Volga Finns
Moksha people
Lists of princes
Former principalities
States and territories established in 1388
States and territories disestablished in 1526